Bold hypothesis or bold conjecture is a concept in the philosophy of science of Karl Popper, first explained in his debut The Logic of Scientific Discovery  (1935) and subsequently elaborated in writings such as Conjectures and Refutations: The Growth of Scientific Knowledge (1963). The concept is nowadays widely used in the philosophy of science and in the philosophy of knowledge. It is also used in the social and behavioural sciences.

Brief explanation
Popper's argument is that the growth of scientific knowledge progresses by means of formulating bold hypotheses, and trying to refute (disprove or falsify) them.  Popper believed that:

He makes this point more specific in a 1953 lecture, where he argues that, if we aim to explain the world, then:

A "bold" hypothesis is a new scientific idea which, if it was true, would be able to predict and/or explain a lot, or a lot more, about the subject  being theorized about.  The "boldness" of a hypothesis depends mainly on:
 
Its scope – the number and variety of phenomena which it could explain, if it is true (its "explanatory power").
its novelty or originality – the extent to which the hypothesis is a genuinely new departure from the received scientific ideas.
whether it enables new and novel predictions ("predictive power").
whether it stimulates new, innovative research ("heuristic power").
Its degree of applicability or usefulness for scientific research ("utility").
The effect or impact it has on existing scientific thinking, if it is true. 
 
Once a bold hypothesis has been mooted, Popper argues, scientists try to investigate and test how well the bold hypothesis can stand up to the known evidence, with the aim of finding counter-arguments which would refute or falsify the bold hypothesis.  In this process of testing and criticism, new scientific knowledge is generated. Even if the bold hypothesis turns out to have been wrong, testing it generates new knowledge about what can and cannot be the case. Often it stimulates new research.

Inversely, if a hypothesis lacks the quality of boldness, then it would make very little difference to what scientists already know. It is not "a big deal", i.e. it is not very significant for the theory which exists already. It can contribute rather little to advancing scientific progress, because it does not expand or add to scientific understanding very much.

According to Popper,

In Popper's philosophy of science, scientific statements are always provisional, they have limits of application, and they could always be wrong. If a statement cannot even in principle be proved wrong, it cannot be a scientific statement. Thus, in Popper's eyes, the falsifiability criterion clearly demarcates "science" from "non-science". This Popperian idea has been very controversial, however. The reason is that it can be quite difficult to test scientifically how true a particular idea is. Even if scientists do want to test an idea, they may not know yet how exactly to test it conclusively. Yet, scientists also don't want to abandon a hunch that seems useful, simply because they don't know how to verify it yet. This point is especially important for "bold" new hypotheses, because the very "boldness" of the new hypothesis could mean that it would take a lot of work before adequate tests could be designed.

Some philosophers have argued that, in the real world, scientists operate routinely with at least some metaphysical beliefs for which they have no proof or verification whatsoever. According to Paul Feyerabend, the creative processes that lead to a scientific discovery are usually quite reasonable and non-arbitrary. However, the creative processes are by no means fully "rational", and they can be quite unique. Thus, the idea that there is one standard model which can define the rationality of all scientific methods should be rejected.

In one of his later writings, Objective Knowledge (1972), Popper argued that:

This interpretation was criticized by Adolf Grünbaum.

Main criticisms
Popper's idea of the role of bold hypotheses in scientific progress has attracted three main kinds of criticisms.
The idea of a bold hypothesis is itself somewhat vague, because exactly "how bold is bold"? It might just depend on how you look at it. Some new ideas, although they are rather modest in themselves, can make a very large difference to the advancement of scientific research. The "boldness" could refer to the content of the hypothesis (considered relative to other possible hypotheses), or to the manner or context in which the hypothesis is presented, to its importance for research, or to the attitude involved. It remains somewhat unclear what kinds of criteria we might use, to credit new hypotheses as "bold" or not. A fashionable scientist might be presented as doing new and bold things, while in reality it was more hype than substance.
Imre Lakatos argued that scientists do not aim to test bold hypotheses in order to falsify them; instead, they aim mainly to confirm hypotheses. A falsified conjecture shows the scientist only "what he does not know", whereas the scientist is more interested in what they  know, and what they can know. The scientist is interested in gaining positive new knowledge, which can be used for practical purposes. The scientist is not primarily interested in “knowing that he doesn’t know things” or in "what is not the case" (other than to rule out possibilities). The scientist wants to know what really  the case. Scientific statements according to this Lakatosian point of view are not falsifiable statements, but fallible statements. Fallible statements are simply statements which could be wrong. Fallible statements include both testable statements and statements of which it is known that they could be wrong, although currently we do not know how to test them yet for their truth or falsity (or, the possible tests are technically not yet feasible). Thus, scientific statements are fallible statements which scientists intend or aim to test for their truth-content. Lakatos did not regard scientific progress simply as a "trial and error" process, but as a process involving definite "do's and don'ts", which he calls "positive heuristics" and "negative heuristics". He believed Popper's philosophy was inconsistent, because Popper claimed definitive falsification was possible, while denying that absolute positive proof of a hypothesis was possible. In Lakatos's view of science, neither is true. There exist no "crucial experiments" which can either prove or disprove a hypothesis definitively. All that really happens, is that scientists decide to accept the results of a test as definitive "for all intents and purposes", even though in principle that methodological decision could later on still be proved wrong.
Scientific researchers have argued that Popper's interpretation does not provide a very realistic picture of what most scientists actually do. They argue that Popper focused on the “glamorous” side of scientific work. In much, if not most, scientific work in the real world, scientists are not mooting bold hypotheses. Instead, they are working patiently on systematic and detailed tests of a small facet of a much larger theory or research programme; Thomas Kuhn called this "normal science". Thus, progress may come about not so much because somebody has a grandiose new idea, but instead because the careful testing of the details of a theory eventually provides definitive scientific conclusions.

Despite these important criticisms, Popper's concept of bold hypotheses continues to be widely used in the academic world. One reason is that, at some level, the concept does make sense, even if (arguably) Popper himself failed to define its role in scientific research very well. Another reason is that academic progress always requires that a scholar does something genuinely new and "breaks new ground". If a scholar only concerns themself with tiny, uncontroversial and fairly trivial claims, they are unlikely to be rewarded very much for their effort. Plausible and credible bold hypotheses are highly valued in the academic world, so long as they are reasonably consistent with well-established scientific findings, and do not seriously challenge scientific authority. 

In the business community, too, innovation is very important, to find new ways to reduce costs, increase sales, and increase profits. A bold new idea can be worth a lot of money, and therefore, business people are often sympathetic to bold attempts to reframe what is known already and to create new ideas; without such innovations, they would eventually be defeated by competitors who have a better idea. So the idea of a bold hypothesis also continues to have a place in economics, management theory and business administration.

See also
Courage
Creativity
Criticism
Criticism of science
Criticisms of anti-scientific viewpoints
Experiment
Falsifiability
Hypothesis
Outline of scientific method
Problem of induction
Scientific progress

Notes and references

Epistemology of science
Science studies
Scientific revolution
Karl Popper
Hypotheses